Vatica granulata is a tree in the family Dipterocarpaceae, native to Borneo. The specific epithet means "like small seeds", referring to the nut surface.

Description
The timber is used in furniture and construction.

Distribution and habitat
Vatica granulata is endemic to Borneo.

References

granulata
Endemic flora of Borneo
Plants described in 1927